At the end of each OFC Nations Cup final tournament, several awards are presented to the players and teams which have distinguished themselves in various aspects of the match.

Awards 
There are currently four post-tournament awards
 the Best Player for most valuable player;
 the Top Goalscorer for most prolific goal scorer;
 the Best Goalkeeper  for most outstanding goalkeeper; 
 the Fair Play Award for the team with the best record of fair play.

Best Player

Top Goalscorer

Best Goalkeeper

Fair Play Award

See also 
 FIFA World Cup awards
 UEFA European Championship awards
 Copa América awards
 Africa Cup of Nations awards
 AFC Asian Cup awards
 CONCACAF Gold Cup awards

References

OFC Nations Cup
Oceania Football Confederation trophies and awards